Honey and Dust is the first book by Piers Moore Ede, British born writer. It won the D. H. Lawrence Prize for non fiction 2007 and is published by Bloomsbury.

It is an account of a personal journey and a man's dream of tasting all the honeys in the world.

After being seriously injured in a hit-and-run, Piers Moore Ede goes to an organic farm in Italy to recuperate. There, a beekeeper shows him the magic of the beehive. Piers, depressed since his accident, realises that honey might be his salvation. The book is the story of his quest to seek out the most wonderful honeys in the world, from the terracotta bee jars of the Lebanon to the clay cylinders of Syria. Slowly his personal problems fall into perspective against the backdrop of the dwindling traditions of the honey-farmers. He hunts wild honey from cliffs with Gurung tribesmen in Nepal, and in vast jungle trees with Veddah tribesmen in Sri Lanka. By witnessing nature's healing powers, Piers finds his own sense of regeneration.

2007 non-fiction books
Honey